Rehnquist  is a surname of Swedish origin. The name element "-quist," a variant of Swedish kvist 'twig,' was in the nineteenth century often used to form surnames in combination with words denoting natural features, here apparently with Swedish ren 'strip of land.' It may refer to:

Björn Rehnquist, professional Swedish tennis player
Janet Rehnquist, former inspector general of the United States Department of Health and Human Services
Milt Rehnquist (1892–1971), American football offensive lineman in the National Football League
William Rehnquist (1924–2005), American lawyer, jurist, and Chief Justice of the United States Supreme Court

References

Swedish-language surnames